The Grammy Award for Soul Gospel Performance by a Duo or Group, Choir or Chorus was awarded from 1984 to 1990. 

Years reflect the year in which the Grammy Awards were presented, for works released in the previous year.

Recipients

References

Grammy Awards for gospel music